Bjeković is a Serbian surname that may refer to:

Nenad Bjeković (born 1947), former Yugoslav and Serbian football player, manager
Nenad Bjeković Jr. (born 1974) is a former Serbian footballer

See also
Bjekić, a surname
Bjegovići, a settlement

Serbian surnames